Sudhagad / Bhorapgad is a hill fort situated in Maharashtra, India. The entire area around the fort is declared a Sudhagad wildlife sanctuary.

History 
The origin of this fort is said to date back to the 2nd century B.C., the same age as the Thanale Caves and Khadsamble caves nearby. It was then called Bhorapgad (after its presiding deity, Bhoraidevi). In 1436, it was captured by the Bahamani Sultan. In 1657, the Marathas took over and renamed it "Sudhagad"(the sweet one). It was a large fort and Sudhagad was considered by Chhatrapati Shivaji Maharaj as the capital of his kingdom. He surveyed it, but instead chose Raigad because of its central location.

In the regime of the Peshwas, the ‘Pantsachivas’ of Bhor became the custodians of this fort. After the annexation of princely states in 1950 the fort became patron less. As a result, the fort is in a state of ruins, even though it escaped the wrath of the British.

Major Features 
The first fort has several ruins of two temples dedicated to Lord Shiva. However, the temple of Bhoraidevi (its patron goddess) is well maintained temple. On the large plateau at the summit, there are two lakes, a house, a big granary, some tombs, a shrine (Vrindavan) and numerous other ruins, scattered around the fort area.  There are three main gates the largest of which is called the Maha Darwaja. From the top, other forts like Sarasgad, Korigad, Ghangad, Taila-Baila are clearly visible.

Current use
Sudhagad is a popular trekking destination as it is one of the better preserved forts in Maharashtra. It takes about 1–2 hours to reach the top of the fort. The trekking route from village Thakurwadi is most popular and regularly used. There are no water cisterns on the way. The night halt at the fort in any season can be made at Pantsachiv wada and Bhorai mata Mandir. There are two water ponds on the fort. On the slopes of the fort there are trees of pandhri which are used to make a popular walking stick.

Gallery

References 

 A rendezvous with Sahyadri by Harshal Mahajan 
 'Sudgagad Darshan', written by Mr. Suresh Potdar

See also 

 List of forts in Maharashtra
 List of forts in India
 Baji Prabhu Deshpande
 Marathi People
 Maratha Navy
 List of Maratha dynasties and states
 Maratha War of Independence
 Battles involving the Maratha Empire
 Maratha Army
 Maratha titles
 Military history of India
 List of people involved in the Maratha Empire

Konkan
Lonavala-Khandala
Talukas in Maharashtra
Forts in Raigad district
Buildings and structures in Lonavala-Khandala
Buildings and structures of the Maratha Empire
16th-century forts in India
Tourist attractions in Pune district
Hiking trails in India